The London boroughs are the 32 local authority districts that together with the City of London make up the administrative area of Greater London; each is governed by a London borough council. The present London boroughs were all created at the same time as Greater London on 1 April 1965 by the London Government Act 1963 and are a type of local government district. Twelve were designated as Inner London boroughs and twenty as Outer London boroughs. The City of London, the historic centre, is a separate ceremonial county and  local government district that functions quite differently from a London borough. However, the two counties together comprise the administrative area of Greater London as well as the London Region, all of which is also governed by the Greater London Authority.

The London boroughs have populations of between 150,000 and 400,000. Inner London boroughs tend to be smaller, in both population and area, and more densely populated than Outer London boroughs. The London boroughs were created by combining groups of former local government units. A review undertaken between 1987 and 1992 led to a number of relatively small alterations in borough boundaries. London borough councils provide the majority of local government services (schools, waste management, social services, libraries), in contrast to the strategic Greater London Authority, which has limited authority over all of Greater London.

The councils were first elected in 1964, and acted as shadow authorities until 1 April 1965. Each borough is divided into electoral wards, subject to periodic review, for the purpose of electing councillors. Council elections take place every four years, with the most recent elections in 2022, and the next elections due in 2026. The political make-up of London borough councils is dominated by the Conservative, Labour and Liberal Democrat parties. Twenty-eight councils follow the leader and cabinet model of executive governance, while five have directly elected mayors (Croydon, Hackney, Lewisham, Newham, and Tower Hamlets). The City of London is instead governed by the City of London Corporation (and the Inner and Middle Temples, which are not governed by the City of London Corporation).

List 

There are four boroughs that do not have "London Borough" in their names: the City of Westminster, and the Royal Boroughs of Kingston upon Thames, Kensington and Chelsea, and Greenwich.

History

Creation 
From the mid-1930s, the Greater London area comprised four types of local government authorities. There were county boroughs, municipal boroughs, urban districts and metropolitan boroughs. The large county boroughs provided all local government services and held the powers usually invested in county councils. The municipal borough and urban district authorities had fewer powers. The situation was made more complex because county councils could delegate functions such as elementary education and library provision to the municipal borough and district councils, and this was implemented piecemeal. Reform of London local government sought to regularise this arrangement.

The Royal Commission on Local Government in Greater London was established in 1957 and the report was published on 19 October 1960. It proposed 52 "Greater London Boroughs" with a population range of 100,000 to 250,000. This was made up of a mixture of whole existing units, mergers of two or three areas, and two boroughs formed as the result of a split. In December 1961 the government proposed that there would be 34 boroughs rather than 52, and detailed their boundaries. The proposed number was further reduced to 32 in 1962.

On 1 April 1965, the 32 London boroughs and Greater London were created by the London Government Act 1963. Twelve boroughs in the former County of London area were designated Inner London boroughs and the 20 others were designated Outer London boroughs. Outer London borough councils were local education authorities, but Inner London borough councils were so designated primarily to continue the existence of an Inner London Education Authority, praised by official Opposition and government who further noted that unusually the former County of London's many small local authorities had no history of providing education. The City of London continued to be administered by the City of London Corporation, and the Inner and Middle Temples continued to govern their own areas.

Elections were held on 7 May 1964, with the new councils acting as shadow authorities before coming into their powers the following year.

Former authorities 
The boroughs were created as follows. Some relatively minor changes have been made to the boundaries of boroughs since 1965, and two have changed their names.

Greater London Council
Between 1965 and 1986 the boroughs were part of a two-tier system of government and shared power with the Greater London Council (GLC). The split of powers and functions meant that the Greater London Council was responsible for "wide area" services such as fire, ambulance, flood prevention, and refuse disposal; with the London borough councils responsible for "personal" services such as social care, libraries, cemeteries and refuse collection. Several London borough councils and the GLC were involved in the rate-capping rebellion of 1985. On 1 April 1986 the GLC was abolished and the borough councils gained responsibility for some services that had been provided by the Greater London Council, such as waste disposal. The Inner London Education Authority continued to exist as an  authority. In 1990 it was abolished and the Inner London borough councils also became local education authorities.

Name and boundary changes 
The Local Government Act 1972 provided a mechanism for the name of a London borough and its council to be changed. This was used by the London Borough of Hammersmith (changed to Hammersmith and Fulham) on 1 April 1979 and the London Borough of Barking (changed to Barking and Dagenham) on 1 January 1980. Borough names formed by combining two locality names had been discouraged when the boroughs were created.

The London boroughs were created by combining whole existing units of local government and it was realised that this might provide arbitrary boundaries in some places. The London Government Act 1963 provided a mechanism for communities on the edge of Greater London to petition for transfer from London boroughs to a neighbouring county district. This was used in 1969 in the transfers of Knockholt in Bromley to Kent, and of Farleigh and Hooley in Croydon to Surrey. The Act also provided for transfers between London boroughs and neighbouring counties where there was consensus for the change between all the relevant local authorities. This provision was used to exchange two islands on the River Thames between Richmond upon Thames and Surrey. (See List of Greater London boundary changes.)

The Local Government Boundary Commission for England was established by the Local Government Act 1972 to review periodically the boundaries of Greater London and the London boroughs. The first review of boundaries commenced on 1 April 1987 and reported in 1992. Following the review a series of relatively minor adjustments were made to borough boundaries, for example uniting the whole of the Becontree estate in Barking and Dagenham. The commission noted that many of its recommendations were strongly opposed and were not implemented. The boundary of the City of London with adjacent boroughs was adjusted to remove some anomalies.

In the London boroughs the legal entity is not the council as elsewhere in the country, but the inhabitants incorporated as a legal entity by royal charter (a process abolished elsewhere in England and Wales under the Local Government Act 1972). Thus, a London authority's official legal title is "The Mayor and Burgesses of the London Borough of X" (or "The Lord Mayor and Citizens of the City of Westminster").

Greater London Authority 
In 2000 the Greater London Authority was created, comprising the Mayor of London and the London Assembly. As a strategic authority, it absorbed only limited powers, such as major highways and planning strategy, from the borough councils.

London borough councils 

The London boroughs are administered by London borough councils (sometimes abbreviated LBCs), which are elected every four years. They are the principal local authorities in London and are responsible for running most local services, such as schools, social services, waste collection and roads. Some London-wide services are run by the Greater London Authority, and some services and lobbying of government are pooled within London Councils. Some councils group together for services such as waste collection and disposal. The boroughs are local government districts and have similar functions to metropolitan boroughs. Each borough council is a local education authority.

Shared services 
Shared services are borough council services shared between two or more boroughs. Shared services were previously resisted due to councils guarding their authority. However, as the need for budget cuts in the late 2000s became apparent some councils have sought service mergers. Westminster and Hammersmith & Fulham were due to merge their education services, including school admissions and transport, by 2011. In October 2010, Hammersmith & Fulham, Kensington & Chelsea and Westminster announced plans to merge all their services to create a "super-council". Each would retain its own political identity, leadership and councillors but staff and budgets would be combined for cost savings. Lambeth and Southwark likewise expressed an interest in sharing services.

The management thinker and inventor of the Vanguard Method, Professor John Seddon, claims that shared service projects based on attempts to achieve economies of scale are a mix of a) the plausibly obvious and b) a little hard data, brought together to produce two broad assertions, for which there is little hard factual evidence. He argues that shared service projects fail (and often end up costing more than they hoped to save) because they cause a disruption to the service flow by moving the work to a central location, creating waste in hand-offs, rework and duplication, lengthening the time it takes to deliver a service and consequently creating failure demand (demand caused by a failure to do something or do something right for a customer). Seddon referred directly to the so-called tri-borough shared services in an article in 2012.

Gallery of London-wide election results

See also 

 Borough
 ISO 3166-2:GB, subdivision codes for the United Kingdom
 Political make-up of local councils in the United Kingdom

Notes

References

External links 
 London Councils' page on the Boroughs
 Directory of current Borough Leaders and Mayors

 
Local government in London
Interested parties in planning in England
Types of subdivision in the United Kingdom